C. Maxx Stevens (born 1951) is an installation artist from the Seminole/Mvskoke Nation of Oklahoma.  She often uses found objects and ephemera in her work which is centered on the concept of memories and stories.  Stevens’ work has been described as “gritty and “both haunting and familiar” and prior installations have focused on the contemporary Native American experience such as the harmful effects of diabetes in Native American communities.

Background 

She earned an associate degree from Haskell Indian Junior College, a Bachelor of Arts from Wichita State University, and a Master of Fine Arts from Indiana University.

Stevens was the Academic Dean in the Center for Arts and Cultural Studies at the Institute of American Indian Arts in Santa Fe, New Mexico from 2002 to 2005. She is an Assistant Professor of Art at the University of Colorado in Boulder, Colorado where she also serves as Foundation Arts Director for the Art and Art History Department.

Exhibitions 

 House of Memory. November 10, 2012 – June 16, 2013. George Gustav Heye Center of the National Museum of the American Indian, New York City.
 Re-Riding History: From the Southern Plains to the Matanzas Bay. 2015-2018.

References

External links
Oral History Interview with C. Maxx Stevens

American installation artists
1951 births
Wichita State University alumni
Indiana University alumni
Living people